American Exorcist is a 2018 independent horror film directed by Tony Trov and Johnny Zito and starring Bill Moseley and Falon Joslyn. It was released in October 2018.

Premise
American Exorcist is about a paranormal investigator, trapped in a haunted high rise on Christmas Eve. She is horrified once confronted with the reality of the supernatural and risks life and limb to escape the stranded 11th floor.

Cast
Bill Moseley as Mr. Snowfeather 
Falon Joslyn as Georgette DuBois
Jeff Orens as Budd Elwood 
Alison Crozier as René DuBois
John McKeever as Frederic
Jo Anna Van Thuyne as Budd's Wife

Production
Production took place in an abandoned government building in Philadelphia, Pennsylvania, in the winter of 2015. Influenced by Italian horror, the crew experimented with many practical special effects.

References

External links
 
 

Films set in Philadelphia
American independent films
American science fiction horror films
Films set in Pennsylvania
Films shot in Philadelphia
2018 films
2018 horror films
2018 horror thriller films
American supernatural horror films
Demons in film
Religious horror films
American Christmas horror films
2010s Christmas horror films
2010s science fiction horror films
2010s English-language films
2010s American films